Live in Toronto is the debut album by the Canadian music organization Art of Time Ensemble, culled from live performances recorded for broadcast by CBC Radio. Live in Toronto was executive produced by the Art Of Time Ensemble's artistic director Andrew Burashko.

Track listing, personnel & production

1. If You Go Away (Ne Me Quitte Pas)
Music and lyrics by Jacques Brel
English lyrics by Mort Shuman
Arranged by Jonathan Goldsmith, George Koller, Rob Piltch & Martin Tielli

Martin Tielli - Vocals
Jonathan Goldsmith - Piano
Rob Piltch - Guitar
George Koller - Bass

Running time - 6:24
Recorded live at the Glenn Gould Studio on November 24, 2004.
Produced by Franz Lehrbass

2. Man In A Room Gambling, No. 9

Music by Gavin Bryars
Text by Juan Muñoz

Mark Fewer - Violin
Jayne Maddison - Violin
Doug Perry - Viola
Roman Borys - Cello
Juan Muñoz - Recorded Voice

Running time - 5:07
Recorded live at the du Maurier Theatre Centre on March 8, 2002.
Produced by David Jaeger

3. Modest Lover (Der Genugsame Liebehaber)

Music by Arnold Schoenberg
Lyrics by Hugo Salus
English lyrics by Michael Feingold
Arranged by Nick Buzz

Martin Tielli - Vocals
Jonathan Goldsmith - Piano
Hugh Marsh - Violin
Rob Piltch - Guitar

Running time - 3:17
Recorded live at the Glenn Gould Studio on February 24, 2003.
Produced by Franz Lehrbass

4. Piano Quintet, Movement V - Moderato Pastorale

Music by Alfred Schnittke

Andrew Burashko - Piano
Stephen Sitarski - Violin
Mark Fewer - Violin
David Rose - Viola
Thomas Wiebe - Cello

Running time - 3:26
Recorded live at the Glenn Gould Studio on November 5, 2001.

5. I'm So Lonesome I Could Cry

Music and lyrics by Hank Williams
Arranged by Rob Piltch.

Melissa Stylianou - Vocals
Rob Piltch - Guitar
Roberto Occhipinti - Bass

Running time - 3:28
Recorded live on March 1, 2004.

6. Gigerlette

Music by Arnold Schoenberg
Lyrics by Otto Julius Bierbaum
English lyrics by Michael Feingold
Arranged by Nick Buzz

Martin Tielli - Vocals
Jonathan Goldsmith - Piano
Hugh Marsh - Violin
Rob Piltch - Guitar

Running time - 4:32
Recorded live at the Glenn Gould Studio on February 24, 2003. 
Produced by Franz Lehrbass

7. Next (Au Suivant)

Music and lyrics by Jacques Brel
English lyrics by Mort Shuman
Arranged by Jonathan Goldsmith, George Koller, Rob Piltch & Martin Tielli

Martin Tielli - Vocals
Jonathan Goldsmith - Piano
Rob Piltch - Guitar
George Koller - Bass

Running time - 2:42
Recorded live at the Glenn Gould Studio on November 24, 2004.
Produced by Franz Lehrbass

8. Jesus' Blood Never Failed Me Yet

Music by Gavin Bryars

Mark Fewer - Violin
Jayne Maddison - Violin
Doug Perry - Viola
Roman Borys - Cello
Ted Quinlan - Guitar
Joel Quarrington - Bass

Running time - 16:17
Recorded live at the du Maurier Theatre Centre on March 8, 2002. 
Produced by David Jaeger

2006 albums
Art of Time Ensemble albums